During 2007, the Australian radio station ABC Classic FM held a Classic 100 Concerto countdown.

The works in the countdown were selected by votes cast by listeners to the station.

The broadcasting of the results of the countdown began on 27 October 2007 and concluded on 31 October 2007. The concert featuring the final five works was broadcast live from the Hamer Hall in Melbourne, and featured the Australian Pro Arte Chamber Orchestra.

Countdown results
The results of the countdown are as follows:

By composer
The following 45 composers were featured in the countdown:

See also 
Classic 100 Countdowns

References

External links

Classic 100 Countdowns (ABC)
2007 in Australian music